is a Japanese businessman and mixed martial arts (MMA) promoter. He is known for his executive role in Dream Stage Entertainment, including its promotions Pride Fighting Championships and Fighting Opera Hustle, and works as the current president of Rizin Fighting Federation.

Career
After graduating from Aichi University in 1987, Sakakibara started working at Tōkai Television Broadcasting, where he organized combat sports events, among them K-1 and Union of Wrestling Forces International. In October 1997, he joined Hiromichi Momose and Naoto Morishita to form Kakutogi Revolution Sports, which produced the first Pride event. KRS dissolved shortly after and its member founded Dream Stage Entertainment as Pride's mother company. In 2003, after Morishita's death, Sakakibara was ascended to Pride presidency. The next year, he also founded and directed Dream Stage Pictures, and participated in the first event of DSE professional wrestling promotion Fighting Opera Hustle. In March 2007, Sakakibara sold Pride to Lorenzo Fertitta.

After his MMA career, Sakakibara served as a backer for soccer team FC Ryukyu. He also produced events for singer Gackt and kabuki actor Ichikawa Ebizō.

Although Sakakibara had originally discarded a comeback to MMA business, he returned in October 2015 by launching Rizin Fighting Federation.

Accomplishments
 Wrestling Observer Newsletter
 Promoter of the Year (2003, 2004)

References

External links
 

1963 births
Living people
People from Handa, Aichi
Mixed martial arts executives
Aichi University alumni